Spathipalpus is a genus of parasitic flies in the family Tachinidae. There is one described species in Spathipalpus, S. philippii.

References

Further reading

 
 
 
 

Tachinidae
Monotypic Brachycera genera
Articles created by Qbugbot
Taxa named by Camillo Rondani